Dread Dominion (1994) is an original novel written by Stephen Marley and based on the long-running British science fiction comic strip Judge Dredd. It is Marley's second Judge Dredd novel.

Synopsis
37 years ago Judge Joe Dredd arrested his brother Judge Rico Dredd for corruption. But in a parallel universe he killed him instead, and the Joe Dredd from that universe turned evil. Now the twisted judges from Dreadworld are invading Mega-City One and the whole world is at stake. Meanwhile, corrupt judges in the Special Judicial Squad are trying to assassinate Judge Hershey.

Continuity
At the time Dread Dominion was published in 1994, its detailed description of events in Mega-City One's history adhered with complete accuracy to what had until then been published in 2000 AD and the Judge Dredd Megazine. However in 2000 the story Blood Cadets in 2000 AD #1186–1188 (written by John Wagner) depicted a different version of how Joe Dredd arrested Rico.

External links
Dread Dominion at the 2000 AD website (note: the title is erroneously given as "Dredd Dominion").

Novels by Stephen Marley
Judge Dredd novels